Glenea bidiscovittata is a species of beetle in the family Cerambycidae. It was described by Stephan von Breuning in 1969.

References

bidiscovittata
Beetles described in 1969